The 1965 Far East Circuit was the fourth season of golf tournaments that comprised the Far East Circuit, later known as the Asia Golf Circuit.

Hsieh Yung-yo of Taiwan was the overall circuit champion.

Schedule
The table below shows the 1965 Far East Circuit schedule. There was one change from the previous season as the circuit finally expanded to six tournaments with the addition of the Thailand Open.

Final standings
The Far East Circuit standings were based on a points system.

References

Far East Circuit
Asia Golf Circuit